is a Japanese manga series written and illustrated by Komatsu Shōta. It was serialized in Shogakukan's Weekly Shōnen Sunday from May 2020 to March 2021, with its chapters collected in four tankōbon volumes.

Publication
Itoyan Goto Naki is written and illustrated by Komatsu Shōta. It is Shōta's debut serialized work. The manga was serialized in Shogakukan's Weekly Shōnen Sunday from May 13, 2020 to March 3, 2021. Shogakukan collected its chapters in four tankōbon volumes, released from September 18, 2020 to May 18, 2021.

Volume list

References

Further reading

External links
 

Comedy anime and manga
School life in anime and manga
Shogakukan manga
Shōnen manga